Weapons Storage and Security System (WS3) is a system including electronic controls and vaults built into the floors of Protective Aircraft Shelters (PAS) on several NATO military airfields all over the world. These vaults are used for safe special weapons storage, typically of tactical B61 nuclear bombs. Historically the system was also called within NATO the Weapon Security and Survivability System (WS3) or Weapons Survivability and Security System.

History

During the Cold War era on the US and NATO bases used by the Quick Reaction Alert readiness forces numbers of bombs were stored in a heavily secured weapon storage area located on or in the vicinity of the base. The 'specials' were located in nuclear weapon (igloo) bunkers. Transporting them to and from the Quick Reaction Alert area (a few heavily guarded aircraft shelters near the main runway) during exercises and for logistic reasons always required a convoy with a large number (approximately 50 armed military) of security forces which included a Security Alert Team, Backup Alert and Reserve Force team.

The WS3 system consists of a Weapons Storage Vault (WSV) and electronic monitoring and control systems. One vault can hold up to four nuclear weapons and in the lowered position provides ballistic protection through its hardened lid and reinforced sidewalls. The WS3 system allowed storage directly underneath the aircraft intended to carry the bombs. The location inside the aircraft shelter increased the weapon survivability in case of any kind of attack and prevented monitoring of preparations to use the weapons. The electronic systems include various classified sensors, electronic data-transmission and security equipment such as video, motion detectors, closed circuit TV coupled with thermal imaging devices. These facilities enabled remote controlled weapon safety and made the large security forces obsolete

Deployment of the WS3 system was authorized in 1988, and they were in widespread use by 1995.

215 WS3 vaults were built for the United States Air Forces in Europe at 13 sites in seven countries. Additionally 34 WS3 vaults were built for the Royal Air Force to store the WE.177 nuclear bomb; 10 at RAF Brüggen in Germany and 24 at RAF Marham in Britain.

Sources
Bechtel National Inc. (USA), Main contractor for the construction program 
Mannesmann Anlagenbau, Düsseldorf, Germany subcontractor mechanical system parts.

References

External links

Nuclear Information: US nuclear weapons in Europe, Friends of the Earth, Flanders & Brussels
Image of a WS3 vault holding British WE.177 nuclear bombs

Military logistics of NATO
United States nuclear command and control
Nuclear weapon safety